West Danville is an unincorporated village in the town of Danville, Caledonia County, Vermont, United States. West Danville has a post office with ZIP code 05873.

In July 2017, the Charles D. Brainerd Public Library reopened in West Danville, again making the village the location of Vermont's smallest library.

References

Unincorporated communities in Caledonia County, Vermont
Unincorporated communities in Vermont